Woodruff is a census-designated place in the Town of Woodruff in Oneida County, Wisconsin, United States.


Description
Woodruff has a post office with ZIP code 54568. As of the 2010 census, its population is 966. Woodruff has a hospital, the Howard Young Medical Center.

See also
 List of census-designated places in Wisconsin

References

External links

Census-designated places in Oneida County, Wisconsin
Census-designated places in Wisconsin